The 1973 Canadian Imperial Bank of Commerce bank robbery occurred in Kenora, Ontario, Canada, on May 10, 1973. A robber entered the Canadian Imperial Bank of Commerce with firearms, a bomb, and bags to hold money. Upon leaving the bank, accompanied by an undercover police officer, he was shot by a police sniper and the bomb detonated. The robber was killed and the officer injured. The robber has never been identified.

Events
On May 10, 1973, a man wearing a black balaclava mask entered the Canadian Imperial Bank of Commerce in Kenora armed with a rifle, a pistol and a homemade bomb consisting of six sticks of dynamite. He held a dead man's switch in his teeth to detonate the bomb. He demanded his shoulder bag and three duffel bags be filled with money. A police officer, constable Don Millard, volunteered to pose as a getaway truck driver. As the pair carried the bags outside, a police sniper shot the robber triggering the bomb and killing the bomber. Constable Millard was injured but partially shielded from the blast by the large duffel bag of money he was carrying, and went on to a career as a firefighter. The street was showered with over $100,000 of cash, virtually all of which was returned.

Aftermath and mystery about bomber's identity
The bomber's wallet was recovered containing a pair of handcuff keys, 176 dollars, and a receipt from the Kenricia Hotel. He had checked into the hotel under the name Paul Higgins with a false address on April 23, two days before apparently taking a bus to Winnipeg. He left a steamer trunk – which also bore the name "P. Higgins" – stored at the hotel. He checked back in on May 5.

The perpetrator wore a mask during the robbery and his features were destroyed in the explosion. 19-year-old Joe Ralko, who wrote a book based on the incident, had seen the man in town in the days beforehand and described him as being in his 40s, with brown hair and a reddish-colored beard. An initial suspect was dismissed when DNA samples from his brother did not match those taken from the crime scene, and was later found to be alive and well in France.

Joe Ralko's book, The Devil's Gap: The Untold Story of Canada's First Suicide Bomber, was released in 2017.

The unidentified man is buried in an unmarked grave in Kenora Cemetery.

See also

 Brian Douglas Wells, victim of an extortion; robbed a bank and also killed by an explosive device connected to his neck outside

References

Bibliography
Ralko, Joe: The Devil's Gap: The Untold Story of Canada's First Suicide Bomber; 2017

External links
Live radio coverage at YouTube

Bank robberies
Crime in Ontario
Explosions in 1973
Improvised explosive device bombings in Canada
May 1973 events in Canada
People shot dead by law enforcement officers in Canada
Unidentified Canadian criminals